Inevitable (Eng.: Inevitably) is the title of a debut album released by Mexican pop music singer Samo, released on July 16, 2013 through Sony Music in México and July 30, 2013 in United States.

Track listing

Personnel
Credits for Inevitable:  

 Samo – composer, coros, primary artist
 Pedro Alfonos – violin
 Rosa Alicia Cole Avendaño – viola
 J. Roberto Garrido Avila – graphic design
 Edgar Barrera – arreglos, composer, engineer, keyboards, string arrangements
 Maria Bernal – composer
 Claudia Brant – composer
 Alejandro Calles – label manager
 Freddy Cañedo – bass
 Gabriel Castañón – engineer
 Andrés Castro – arreglos, composer, engineer, guitar, keyboards, string arrangements
 Tom Coyne – mastering
 Jackie D'Silva – coros
Gabriela Aldana Domenzain – violin
 Daniel Itzcoatl Uribe Domínguez – violin
 Vicky Echeverri – coros
 Irene Del Carmen Cabezas Fernández – violin
 Charlie Garcia – A&R
 Arbise "Motiff" Gonzalez – composer
 Laura Adriana Martínez González – cello
 Fabián Rangel Gutiérrez – violin
 Mike Hernandez – composer
 Zavaleta Hernández – viola
 Amanda Judith Contreras Jaramillo – violin
 Martha Jeamina – wardrobe coordinator
 Marie Claire Kobeh – label manager
 Marielos Labias – coros
 Guillermo Gutiérrez Leyva – A&R
 Konstantin Litvinenko – cello
 Johnny Lopera – photography
 Eduardo Carlos Juárez López – violin
 Cinthya Karina González Madrigal – violin
 Pablo Manresa – arreglos, engineer, piano, programming, string arrangements
 Victor Manuel – viola
 Eliacim Martínez – composer
 Patricia Amelia Luison Mata – cello
 Chino Mejía – composer
 Ana Margarita Hernández Mogollón – violin

 Peter Mokran – mezcla
 Xiuhnel Valdivia Morales – cello
 Manu Moreno - composer
 Motiff – arreglos, guitar, keyboards, percussion
 Mauro Muñoz – composer
 Orquesta Sinfónica Juvenil Del Estado De Veracruz – cuerda
 Lizete Ozuna – coros
 Shafik Palis – engineer
 William Paredes – trombone
 Sara Parra – coros
 David Peña – photography
 Kiolal Vélez Peralta – cello
 Luis Portillo – piano
 Pablo Preciado – composer
 Martin Sánchez Ramos – violin
 Ana Alicia Martínez Rivera – viola
 Valeria Roa Rizo – violin
 Alberto J. Rodríguez – assistant engineer
 Pablo Nicolás González Rodríguez – violin
 Alejandro Román – coordination executive
 Carlos Rosas – composer
 David Sebastián Morales Sánchez – viola
 Roberto Sanchez – assistant engineer
 Curt Schneider – mezcla
 Rosino Serrano – string arrangements
 Anayantzi Oropeza Silva – viola
 Manahem Jedidías Abisai Fuentes Solana – violin
 José Ramón Solano – engineer
 Joanna Téllez Sossa – arpa
 Roy Tavare – composer
 Francisco Raúl Silva Torres – violin
 Claudia Belén Ríos Trujillo – violin
 Carlos Rafael Aguilar Uscanga – violin
 Edy Vega – bateria
 Abraham Velázquez Aguilar – viola
 Rafa Vergara – arreglos, composer, coros, engineer, programming, string arrangements
 Dan Warner – engineer, guitar, guitar (acoustic), guitar (electric)
 Eric Weaver – assistant engineer

Chart performance

Release history

References

Spanish-language albums
Sony Music Latin albums
2013 debut albums